Vincent Joseph Dooley (September 4, 1932 – October 28, 2022) was an American college football coach. He was the head coach of the Georgia Bulldogs from 1964 to 1988, as well as the University of Georgia's (UGA) athletic director from 1979 to 2004. During his 25-year head coaching career, Dooley compiled a 201–77–10 record. His teams won six Southeastern Conference (SEC) titles and the 1980 national championship. After the 1980 season, Dooley was recognized as college football's "Coach of the Year" by several organizations.

Early life and education
Dooley was born in Mobile, Alabama, on September 4, 1932. He was of Irish and Italian descent. He attended the McGill Institute, administered by the Brothers of the Sacred Heart. He competed on behalf of McGill's athletic teams, known as the Yellow Jackets. He was recognized as an all-state player in both football and basketball, but considered the latter to be his best sport.

Dooley was awarded a football scholarship to study at Auburn University, where he played college football and later coached under Ralph "Shug" Jordan. He graduated with a bachelor's degree in business management in 1954, and was a member of the Phi Kappa Theta fraternity. After serving as an infantry officer in the United States Marine Corps from 1954 to 1956, he returned to Auburn and eventually obtained a master's degree in history in 1963.

Coaching career
While he was completing his master's at Auburn, Dooley first worked as quarterback coach under Jordan for five years, before serving as the school's head freshman coach for three years. He was then appointed head coach of the Georgia Bulldogs in 1963, at the age of 31, even though he had no prior experience at that position. During his first season with the team, Dooley finished with a 7–3–1 record and led the Bulldogs to the Sun Bowl, defeating the Texas Tech Red Raiders. He oversaw Georgia's upset 18–17 win over Alabama, the defending national champion, in the opening game of 1965, before guiding Georgia to the 1966 Southeastern Conference (SEC) title, their first in seven seasons. The school lost only one game that year, won the Cotton Bowl Classic against the SMU Mustangs, and the finished as 4th in the final poll of the season. Two years later, Georgia won their second SEC title under Dooley, but they lost the Sugar Bowl to the Arkansas Razorbacks.

Dooley led the Bulldogs to victories in the December 1971 Gator Bowl and the Peach Bowl two years later. He won his third SEC title with the school in 1976, losing only one game in the regular season and shutting out the Alabama Crimson Tide 21–0 at home. However, UGA lost the Sugar Bowl that year 27–3 to Pittsburgh, the national champions. At the end of the season, Dooley became the first recipient of the Bobby Dodd Coach of the Year Award. Georgia finished the 1977 season with a 5–6 record, representing the only losing season in Dooley's career as head coach. Two years later, he was appointed as Georgia's co-athletic director after Joel Eaves retired, before gaining the role exclusively in 1980 to entice him to stay at UGA after Auburn (his alma mater) offered him the position of football coach and athletic director. The Bulldogs finished the 1980 season with a perfect 12–0 record and became consensus national champions for the first time after defeating Notre Dame 17–10 in the Sugar Bowl. Dooley was consequently honored as AFCA Coach of the Year, Eddie Robinson Coach of the Year, Walter Camp Coach of the Year, and Sporting News College Football Coach of the Year.

The Bulldogs won two more SEC titles during Dooley's tenure (1981 and 1982), but lost the Sugar Bowl in both those seasons. Georgia won the Cotton Bowl in 1983, the Liberty Bowl four years later, and the 1988 Gator Bowl, his final game as head coach. In his 25 seasons as Georgia's head football coach, Dooley won six SEC championships and led the school to 201 victories. He was also named SEC Coach of the Year four times (1966, 1968, 1976, and 1980). Dooley retired as head coach at the conclusion of the 1988 season. At the time, he was the second-winningest coach in SEC history, behind only Bear Bryant.

Later career
Although Dooley also intended to retire as UGA's athletic director in 1988, he agreed to remain until his successor could be appointed. However, no replacement was forthcoming and he retained his position. During his tenure as athletic director, he hired former football coach Mark Richt from Florida State University.

Dooley briefly pursued the Democratic Party nomination for Senate seat in Georgia in July 1985 while he was still Georgia's head coach, but ultimately decided against running, stating that it would be "very poor timing" for him to leave the team before the start of the season. He also considered running for governor of Georgia five years later. His wife ran in the Republican Party primary for U.S. House in 2002. Dooley resigned as Georgia's athletic director in 2004, after feuding with the university's president Michael F. Adams. He was later hired by Kennesaw State University in December 2009 to work as their consultant, as part of the school's drive to start a football program.

One of Dooley's hobbies in retirement was gardening, about which he has published a book. He also partnered with Mascot Books to publish two children's books about the UGA mascot, How 'Bout Them Dawgs! and Hairy Dawg's Journey Through the Peach State. Dooley was the chairman of the board of curators for the Georgia Historical Society from 2016 to 2018.

Personal life
Dooley married Barbara Meshad in March 1960. They met while studying at Auburn together, and remained married until his death. Together, they had four children. One of them, Derek Dooley, was the head football coach at the University of Tennessee and Louisiana Tech University, an assistant coach for the Miami Dolphins, the University of Georgia, Missouri, and LSU, as well as a position coach for the New York Giants.

Dooley's younger brother, Bill Dooley, worked on the Georgia Bulldogs football staff, before becoming a noted college head coach in his own right at the University of North Carolina, Virginia Tech, and Wake Forest. The two brothers found themselves on opposing sidelines during the December 1971 Gator Bowl, played in Jacksonville, Florida.

Dooley died on October 28, 2022, at home in Athens, Georgia. He was 90, and had recovered from mild symptoms of COVID-19 in the same month as his death.

Dooley was interred at Oconee Hill Cemetery, behind Sanford Stadium, on November 3, 2022.

Awards and honors

Dooley was inducted in the Georgia Sports Hall of Fame in 1978, the Alabama Sports Hall of Fame in 1984, and the College Football Hall of Fame in 1994. He was conferred the Amos Alonzo Stagg Award, presented by the American Football Coaches Association in 2001. Two years later, the U.S. Sports Academy presented Dooley with the Carl Maddox Sport Management Award, an award given annually to an individual for contribution to the growth and development of sports through management practices. In 2004, Dooley was enshrined into UGA's Circle of Honor, which is the school's highest tribute to former athletes and coaches. Dooley received the Homer Rice Award, the highest honor given by the Division I-A Athletic Directors Association, in September 2007.

Dooley was inducted as a Georgia Trustee in 2011. Conferred by the Georgia Historical Society, in conjunction with the Governor of Georgia, to individuals whose accomplishments and community service reflect the ideals of the founding body of Trustees, which governed the Georgia colony from 1732 to 1752. He was inducted into the Marine Corps Sports Hall of Fame in July 2012. Six years later, the Georgia Historical Society established the Vincent J. Dooley Distinguished Fellows Program in honor of Dooley. It was designed to accomplish two goals consistent with Dooley's life and legacy – recognizing senior scholars in the field of history and mentoring and developing emerging historians. Historian David Blight and author Rick Atkinson have been named Vincent J. Dooley Distinguished Teaching Fellows.

On September 7, 2019, the football field at the University of Georgia was renamed "Dooley Field" in honor of the coach.

Head coaching record

See also
 List of college football coaches with 200 wins
 List of presidents of the American Football Coaches Association
 Legends Poll

Citations

General and cited sources
 The New Georgia Encyclopedia (November 9, 2004). "Vince Dooley (b. 1932)". Retrieved May 13, 2005.

External links
 
 Vince Dooley papers at the Georgia Historical Society

1932 births
2022 deaths
American football quarterbacks
American men's basketball players
Auburn Tigers football coaches
Auburn Tigers football players
Auburn Tigers men's basketball players
College Football Hall of Fame inductees
Georgia Bulldogs and Lady Bulldogs athletic directors
Georgia Bulldogs football coaches
United States Marine Corps officers
Sportspeople from Mobile, Alabama
Coaches of American football from Alabama
Players of American football from Alabama
Basketball players from Alabama
Military personnel from Mobile, Alabama